The Centre for Energy, Environmental and Technological Research (CIEMAT), until 1986 Junta de Energía Nuclear (JEN), is a Spanish public research institution.

History

The Centre for Energy, Environmental and Technological Research (CIEMAT) is a Spanish public research institution in energy and the environment. It is attached to the General Secretariat for Research of the Ministry of Science and Innovation.

In September 1948, Francisco Franco, by means of a decree of reserved character, created the Board of Atomic Investigations o Junta de Investigaciones Atómicas (JIA), constituted 8 October 1948 and formed by Jose Maria Otero de Navascués (director-general and president until 1974), Manuel Lora-Tamayo, Armando Durán Miranda and José Ramón Sobredo i Rioboo.

In 1951, finished the secret phase, it was rebaptized as Board of Nuclear power or Junta de Energía Nuclear (JEN), under the presidency of general Juan Vigón and with Otero de Navascués like chief of a main directorate later would be its president again), and has since carried out research and technological development projects, serving as a reference to technically represent Spain in international forums and to advise public administrations on matters within their competence.

In 1956 Guillermo Velarde entered the Division of Theoretical Physics of this Meeting, later being named Director of Technology that included the Divisions of Electronics, Theory and Calculation of Reactors, Nuclear Fusion, Engineering and Reactors in Operation.

References

External links

Research institutes in the Community of Madrid
Government agencies of Spain
Governmental nuclear organizations
Nuclear power in Spain
Nuclear research institutes
Nuclear technology organizations of Spain
Complutense University of Madrid